Trimeresurus arunachalensis, the Arunachal pitviper, is a species of venomous pit viper endemic to the Indian state of Arunachal Pradesh. It is only known from the village of Ramda in the West Kameng district, where a single specimen was discovered during biodiversity surveys. It can physically be distinguished by its scalation, its acutely pointed snout reminiscent of the hump-nosed viper (Hypnale hypnale), and its brownish dorsal coloration with glossy orange-reddish-brown sides and belly. The last new species of (green) pit viper was described from India 70 years before the discovery of T. arunachalensis. Genetic analysis indicates that the closest relative of this species is the Tibetan bamboo pit viper (T. tibetanus). The single specimen known of this species makes it one of the rarest known pit vipers in the world, though further surveys of the forest habitat will likely reveal more individuals.

References

arunachelensis
Endemic fauna of India
Reptiles of India
Reptiles described in 2019
Taxa named by Veerappan Deepak
Species known from a single specimen